Victor Arnold (9 October 1873 – 16 October 1914) was an Austrian actor. He appeared in six films from 1910 to 1914.

Selected filmography

References

External links 

1873 births
1914 deaths
Austrian male film actors
Austrian male silent film actors
20th-century Austrian male actors
Austrian male stage actors
Male actors from Vienna